Granite City Township is located in Madison County, Illinois, in the United States. Granite City Township was founded in 1896, close to the Mississippi River. It quickly became an industrialized city due to its access to the Mississippi River and railroads. Granite City's population has long relied on its steel mill (Granite City Steel) as a source of income. As of the 2020 census, its population was 27,549.

Geography

Demographics
According to the U.S. Census Bureau, in 2020 Granite City's population is made up of 83.6% of White Non Hispanics people, 11.9% African American people, and 8.3% Hispanic or Latino people.

References

External links
City-data.com
Illinois State Archives

Townships in Madison County, Illinois
Townships in Illinois